Built in 1930, the DeSmet was constructed to carry passengers on Lake McDonald, Glacier National Park. In 2017 the DeSmet was listed on the National Register of Historic Places.

History 
Captain J.W. Swanson built the tour boat DeSmet in 1930, for the Glacier Park Transport Company. In 1938, Arthur J. Burch purchased the contract to provide boat services in Glacier National Park. The DeSmet was named after Father Pierre DeSmet, a prominent Jesuit missionary in the area.

Specifications 
The DeSmet is a 57-foot carvel planked launch with cedar on an oak frame. The vessel is authorized by the U.S. Coast Guard to carry 70 passengers.

Current operations 
The DeSmet has run annually since 1930 and operates daily from mid-May until late September. During summer operations the vessel is docked behind the Lake McDonald Lodge and is used to provide boat rides to tourists in Glacier National Park. During winter months the DeSmet is stored in the historic Fish Creek Bay Boathouse at the foot of Lake McDonald.

References 

Boats
National Register of Historic Places in Flathead County, Montana
National Register of Historic Places in Glacier National Park
Water transportation on the National Register of Historic Places
Transportation on the National Register of Historic Places in Montana
Transportation in Flathead County, Montana
1930 ships
1930 establishments in Montana